Asivak Koostachin (born 1994) is a Cree-Inuk actor from Canada, most noted for his performances in the films Red Snow and Run Woman Run.

The son of filmmaker Jules Arita Koostachin, he had his first major acting role in the APTN drama series AskiBoyz. In 2018 he had a stage role in Theatre for Living's collective play šxʷʔa'ət (home).

Red Snow, his first leading role in a feature film, was released in 2019. He received a Leo Award nomination for Best Lead Performance by a Male in a Motion Picture, and a nomination for Best Actor at the 2019 American Indian Film Festival.

In 2021 he appeared in Run Woman Run as the ghost of Tom Longboat. He received a second nomination for Best Actor at the 2021 American Indian Film Festival, and won the Remi Award for Best Actor at the 2021 WorldFest-Houston International Film Festival. He won the award for Best Supporting Actor at the 2021 American Indian Film Festival for his performance in Portraits from a Fire.

He has also appeared in the films Montana Story and Broken Angel, and has had supporting or guest roles in the television series Letterkenny, Cardinal, Hudson & Rex and Molly of Denali.

References

External links

1994 births
Living people
21st-century Canadian male actors
Canadian male film actors
Canadian male television actors
Canadian male stage actors
Cree people
Inuit male actors
First Nations male actors